Rui Borges (born 4 June 1967) is a Portuguese swimmer. He competed in the men's 400 metre individual medley at the 1988 Summer Olympics.

References

External links
 

1967 births
Living people
Portuguese male medley swimmers
Olympic swimmers of Portugal
Swimmers at the 1988 Summer Olympics
Place of birth missing (living people)